The 2018 Judo Grand Prix Hohhot was held at the Inner Mongolia Stadium in Hohhot, China, from 25 to 27 May 2018.

Medal summary

Men's events

Women's events

Source Results

Medal table

References

External links
 

2018 IJF World Tour
2018 Judo Grand Prix
Judo